Les Droites is a mountain in the Mont Blanc massif in the French Alps and is the lowest of the 4000-metre peaks in the Alps. The mountain has two summits:
 West summit (3,984 m), first ascent by W. A. B. Coolidge, Christian Almer and Ulrich Almer on 16 July 1876
 East summit (4,000 m), first ascent by Thomas Middlemore and John Oakley Maund with Henri Cordier, Johann Jaun and Andreas Maurer on 7 August 1876

The north face of the mountain rises some 1,600 m from the Argentière basin at an average angle of 60°, and is the steepest face on the 10-km-long ridge that stretches from the Aiguille Verte to Mont Dolent. The first route to be made on it was via the central couloir on the north-east flank by Bobi Arsandaux and Jacques Lagarde on 31 July 1930. The north spur was first climbed in 1972 by French alpinist Nicolas Jaeger. The dangers of climbing this face were highlighted on an episode of the Discovery Channel documentary series I Shouldn't Be Alive.

Huts
 Refuge d' Argentière (2,771 m) 
 Refuge du Couvercle (2,687 m)

See also

List of 4000 metre peaks of the Alps
List of mountains of the Alps above 3000 m

References

 Dumler, Helmut and Willi P. Burkhardt, The High Mountains of the Alps, London: Diadem, 1994

External links

 Les Droites on SummitPost

Alpine four-thousanders
Mountains of the Alps
Mountains of Haute-Savoie
Mont Blanc massif